Atlantean Kodex is a German heavy metal band from Vilseck in Bavaria. The band is under contract with Ván Records and has released three studio albums so far.

History

Early years (2005–2010)
The band was founded in 2005 by Manuel Trummer (guitar) and Florian Kreuzer (bass). The further members Markus Becker (vocals), Michael Koch (guitar) and Mario White (drums) joined two years later. In 2007, they released the demo The Pnakotic Demos, followed by the EPs A Prophet in the Forest and The Pnakotic Vinyls two years later.

The Golden Bough and The White Goddess (2010–present)
Atlantean Kodex signed to the Italian label Cruz del Sur Music. In 2010, the debut album The Golden Bough was released. The title comes from the book The Golden Bough of the Scottish anthropologist James George Frazer, who believed that all European religions evolved from the magical thinking of the Stone Age people. He considered magic to be the root of religions.

The album became album of the month in the magazine Rock Hard, as well as in the Heavy oder was? magazine and in the Greek Metal Hammer. In the annual polls of the online communities of Sacred Metal and Rock Hard, The Golden Bough won in the category "Album of the Year". In 2011, Atlantean Kodex played at the Rock Hard Festival, in 2012 they were confirmed for the Bang Your Head!!! festival, but had to cancel their performance; however, in 2014 they played the festival.

The second album The White Goddess was published on 4 October 2013 and received positive reviews again in the press. It entered the German charts at number 65.

Musical style
Atlantean Kodex was founded by Manuel Trummer to create an alternative to modern metal. Key influences were old Manowar and Bathory. The band plays epic heavy metal based on doom metal, which was described as a mixture of Candlemass and Solitude Aeturnus with Manowar, Iced Earth, Bathory or Solstice. Another influence is the hard rock of the 1970s, like Uriah Heep or Rainbow.

For the lyrics Trummer was inspired by ancient European mythology, writers such as H.P. Lovecraft, Robert E. Howard or Carl Amery as well as Bavarian culture. The musicians are considered to be advocates of analogue recording techniques and have spoken out repeatedly in interviews accordingly.

Discography

Studio albums
 2010: The Golden Bough
 2013: The White Goddess
 2019: The Course of Empire

EPs
 2008: A Prophet in the Forest
 2009: The Pnakotic Vinyls

Other
 2006: The Hidden Folk (split with Vestal Claret)
 2007: The Pnakotic Demos (demo)
 2009: The Annihilation of Königshofen (live)
 2010: The Pnakotic Demos + Fragments of Yuggoth
 2010: The Annihilation of Nürnberg (live)
 2017: The Annihilation of Bavaria (live)
 2020: The Annihilation of Tyrol (live)
 2021: The Annihilation of Vienna (live)

References

External links

 
 

German heavy metal musical groups
German doom metal musical groups
Musical groups established in 2005